Neomyrtus is a genus of plants in the family Myrtaceae described in 1941. It contains only one known species, Neomyrtus pedunculata, endemic to New Zealand. It is found there on both the North Island and the South Island.

References

Myrtaceae
Endemic flora of New Zealand
Monotypic Myrtaceae genera
Taxa named by Max Burret